Clinical Psychological Science is a peer-reviewed academic journal covering clinical psychology. It is published by SAGE Publications on behalf of the Association for Psychological Science. The journal was established in 2013 as a quarterly, moving to bimonthly in 2014. The founding editor-in-chief was Alan E. Kazdin (Yale University), who was succeeded as editor-in-chief by Scott O. Lilienfeld (Emory University). The current editor-in-chief is Jennifer Tackett.

Abstracting and indexing
The journal is abstracted and indexed in:
 PsycINFO
 Scopus

References

External links 
 

English-language journals
Publications established in 2012
SAGE Publishing academic journals
Psychology journals
Bimonthly journals